Scytinium is a genus of lichen-forming fungi in the family Collemataceae. It has 49 species.

Species
Scytinium apalachense 
Scytinium aquale 
Scytinium aragonii 
Scytinium biatorinum 
Scytinium bosoense 
Scytinium californicum 
Scytinium callopismum 
Scytinium cellulosum 
Scytinium chibaense 
Scytinium contortum 
Scytinium dactylinum 
Scytinium erectum 
Scytinium euthallinum 
Scytinium ferax 
Scytinium fragile 
Scytinium fragrans 
Scytinium gelatinosum 
Scytinium imbricatum 
Scytinium intermedium 
Scytinium juniperinum 
Scytinium kauaiense 
Scytinium leptogioides 
Scytinium lichenoides 
Scytinium magnussonii 
Scytinium massiliense 
Scytinium palmatum 
Scytinium palustre 
Scytinium parculum 
Scytinium parvum 
Scytinium platynum 
Scytinium plicatile 
Scytinium polycarpum 
Scytinium pulvinatum 
Scytinium quadrifidum 
Scytinium rivale 
Scytinium rogersii 
Scytinium schraderi 
Scytinium singulare 
Scytinium siskiyouense 
Scytinium subaridum 
Scytinium subfragrans 
Scytinium subtile 
Scytinium subtorulosum 
Scytinium tacomae 
Scytinium tenuilobum  – Australia
Scytinium tenuissimum 
Scytinium tetrasporum 
Scytinium turgidum

References

Peltigerales
Taxa described in 1810
Taxa named by Erik Acharius
Peltigerales genera